The America's Crossroads Bowl is an annual American NCAA Division II college football bowl game between teams from the Great Lakes Valley Conference (GLVC) and Great Midwest Athletic Conference (G-MAC) held at Brickyard Stadium in Hobart, Indiana. The game operates as a partnership between the two conferences, the city of Hobart, and the South Shore Convention and Visitors Authority.

It is one of four NCAA Division II sanctioned bowl games; the others are the Mineral Water Bowl (currently on hiatus), the Heritage Bowl, and the Live United Texarkana Bowl. Like the other Division II bowls, the game is held annually on the first Saturday in December. The top-placing teams in the GLVC and G-MAC not qualifying for the NCAA Division II National Football Championship playoffs receive an invitation to compete.

For every game thus far, the G-MAC has sent its second-place team or a team finishing the season in a second-place tie behind the conference's lone Division II playoff qualifier. Because Lindenwood and Indianapolis both qualified for the Division II playoffs in 2019, the GLVC sent third-place Truman State as its representative to the inaugural game. After the 2020 game was cancelled due to the COVID-19 pandemic, Truman State once again represented the GLVC in 2021 as a third-place team, when Lindenwood qualified for the playoffs and Indianapolis declined the bowl bid. Truman State represented the GLVC for a third consecutive time in 2022, after finishing the conference season in second place behind Indianapolis.

The 2022 game brought an estimated $200,000 in economic impact to the Hobart area.

Game results

References

External links 
 

College football bowls
NCAA Division II
American football in Indiana